Peperomia blanda var floribunda is a succulent herb in the family Piperaceae. The typical habitat is damp rock crevices, sometimes terrestrial. Found in Australia, Africa, India, Malesia and Melanesia. Treated by some authorities as Peperomia leptostachya.

References

blanda var. floribunda
Flora of New South Wales
Flora of Queensland
Flora of Africa
Flora of India (region)
Flora of Malesia
Flora of Melanesia